is a Japanese toy and computer games company founded in 1958 which is best known for manufacturing Barcode Battler and Doraemon video games, and the Sylvanian Families series of toys. Its current Representative President is Michihiro Maeda.

They also made Japan's first successful programmable console video game system, the Cassette Vision, in 1981.

History

Founded in May 1958 by Maeda Taketora and three others in Tokyo with ¥1 million, Maeda Taketora is made president, eleven months later, it had increased its capital to ¥2.5 million. Epoch participated in the first Japanese international toy trade fair in 1962. It moved to its headquarters to its current location in Tokyo in 1963. After 20 years of its founding in 1978, Epoch had increased to ¥200 million - 200 times the original startup cost. It also had a United States office, which sold imported English versions of its products. In September 2001 it founded an international branch. It acquired International Playthings of the United States in 2008. It is most famous for its Doraemon and Sylvanian Families toy and video game productions.

Video game consoles 

 TV Tennis Electrotennis (September 12, 1975)
 TV Game System 10 (1977)
 TV Baseball (1978)
 Cassette TV Game (1979)
 TV Vader (1980)
 Cassette Vision (July 30, 1981)
 Cassette Vision Jr. (1983)
 Super Cassette Vision (July 17, 1984)
 Epoch Game Pocket Computer (1984, first programmable handheld game console)
 SCV Lady’s Set (1985)
 Barcode Battler (March 1991)

LCD handheld electronic games 
Epoch also created many LCD handheld electronic games. Some of these were made in cooperation with ITMC, Gama-Mangold, Tomy and other companies.

Computer games produced

Doraemon Games
Doraemon: Giga Zombie no Gyakushuu
Doraemon
Doraemon 2
Doraemon 3
Doraemon 4
Doraemon: Nobita to Fukkatsu no Hoshi
Doraemon 2: SOS! Otogi no Kuni
Doraemon
Doraemon Kart
Doraemon no GameBoy de Asobou yo DX10
Doraemon 2
Doraemon Kart 2
Doraemon: Aruke Aruke Labyrinth
Doraemon Memories: Nobita no Omoide Daibouken
Doraemon: Nobita to 3-tsu no Seirei Ishi (N64)
Doraemon 2: Nobita to Hikari no Shinden (N64)
Doraemon 3: Nobita no Machi SOS! (N64)
Doraemon 3: Makai no Dungeon
Doraemon no Study Boy: Kuku Game
Doraemon no Study Boy: Gakushuu Kanji Game
Doraemon Kimi to Pet no Monogatari
Doraemon Board Game
Doraemon no Quiz Boy 2
Doraemon no Study Boy: Kanji Yomikaki Master

Sylvanian Families Games
  (Game Boy Color)
  (Game Boy Color)
  (Game Boy Color)
  (Game Boy Color)
  (Game Boy Advance)
  (Game Boy Advance)
  (Game Boy Advance)

Licensed Games
Chibi Maruko-chan: Harikiri 365-Nichi no Maki
Lupin III: Densetsu no Hihō o Oe!
The Amazing Spider-Man: Lethal Foes
Donald Duck no Mahō no Bōshi
St Andrews: Eikō to Rekishi no Old Course
Alice no Paint Adventure
Chibi Maruko-Chan: Go-Chōnai Minna de Game da yo!

Other games
Famicom Yakyuuban
Kiteretsu Daihyakka
Cyraid
Dragon Slayer I
Parasol Henbee
Dai Meiro: Meikyu no Tatsujin
Dragon Slayer (Game Boy)
Dragon Slayer Gaiden (Game Boy)
Dragon Slayer: The Legend of Heroes (Super Famicom)
Dragon Slayer: The Legend of Heroes II (Super Famicom)
Panel no Ninja Kesamaru
Lord Monarch
Metal Jack
Barcode Battler Senki
Hatayama Hatch no Pro Yakyuu News! Jitsumei Han
Oha Star Yamachan & Reimondo
Hole in One Golf
Meisha Retsuden: Greatest 70's
J.League Excite Stage '94
J.League Excite Stage '95
J.League Excite Stage '96
J-League Excite Stage GB
J-League Excite Stage Tactics
International Soccer Excite Stage 2000
R-Type DX
Ling Rise
Pocket Pro Yakyuu
Macross 7: Ginga no Heart o Furuwasero!!
Gauntlet Legends
DaiaDroids World
Kidou Tenshi Angelic Layer
The Legend of Zelda: A Link to the Past (Barcode Battler II)
Magi Nation
Daia Droid Daisakusen

References

External links
 Epoch's official website
 Epoch History - 1958 to 2007
 http://www.gamefaqs.com/features/company/12782.html
 Epoch Handheld Games - Handheld Museum

Video game companies of Japan
Electronics companies established in 1958
Toy companies of Japan
Japanese companies established in 1958
Japanese brands